Isotope is an album by pianist Kirk Lightsey that was recorded in 1983 and released by the Dutch Criss Cross Jazz label. The 1993 CD reissue included an additional track recorded in 1991.

Reception 

The AllMusic review states "The strong interplay between the musicians and the interesting material uplift the set above the average trio date".

Track listing 
 "Isotope" (Joe Henderson) – 6:54
 "Oleo" (Sonny Rollins) – 4:59
 "Pee Wee" (Tony Williams) – 9:46
 "Witch Hunt" (Wayne Shorter) – 7:59
 "A Monk's Dream" (Johnny Griffin) – 5:30
 "Little Daphne" (Rudolph Johnson) – 12:43
 "I'll Never Stop Loving You" (Nicholas Brodszky, Sammy Cahn) – 6:40 Bonus track on CD reissue
Recorded at Studio 44, Monster, Holland on  February 14, 1983 (tracks 1–6) and at Sear Sound, New York City on December 13, 1991 (track 7)

Personnel 
Kirk Lightsey – piano
Jesper Lundgaard – bass
Eddie Gladden – drums

References 

Kirk Lightsey albums
1983 albums
Criss Cross Jazz albums